Natalie Lynn Gregory is an American former child actress.

Career 
She starred as Alice in the 1985 television film Alice in Wonderland. Gregory is the youngest actress (age 9 years when she filmed the miniseries) to have played the role in a television or sound-film production based on the Lewis Carroll novels. (British actress Sarah Sutton was 11 portraying Alice in a 1973 BBC production.) Gregory's performance in the film earned a nomination for Exceptional Young Actress Starring in a Television Special or Movie of the Week at the 1986 Young Artist Awards. 

Her real-life sister Sharee Gregory portrayed Alice's elder sister in the film; Sharee married Michael Landon Jr. in 1987.

Gregory has had guest-starring roles in a number of television series including a two-part episode of Highway to Heaven, starring her brother-in-law's father. She provided the voice of Jenny Foxworth for the 1988 Disney animated film Oliver & Company.

She has also appeared as Annie at Cranium Command, an attraction at Epcot, a Walt Disney World Resort theme park. Prior to acting in movies and TV shows, she got her start appearing in commercials for certain products, such as Hamburger Helper, Care Bears, McDonald's, and Chips Ahoy.

Filmography

References

External links 
 

American child actresses
American film actresses
Place of birth missing (living people)
American television actresses
American voice actresses
Living people
21st-century American women
Year of birth missing (living people)